Manfred Steiner (born 1932) is an Austrian-born American hematologist and physicist who taught at Brown Medical School until 2000. He completed a Ph.D. in Physics at the age of 89 in September 2021.

Life 
Steiner was born in Vienna in 1932. He earned a medical degree from the University of Vienna in 1955 and moved to Washington, D.C. to complete his initial training in internal medicine. Steiner studied hematology at Tufts University before earning a Ph.D. in biochemistry from the Massachusetts Institute of Technology in 1967.

Steiner moved to Rhode Island to teach at the Medical School of Brown University, where he was promoted to full professor in 1978. Towards the end of his career, Steiner worked to establish a program in hematology at the University South Carolina School of Medicine, Greenville. He retired from medicine in 2000.

In September 2021, Steiner completed a Ph.D. in physics at Brown University; his dissertation was entitled Corrections to the Geometrical Interpretation of Bosonization.

References

External links

Living people
Austrian expatriates in the United States
Brown University alumni
20th-century Austrian physicians
20th-century American physicians
21st-century American physicians
21st-century American physicists
Physician-scientists
Massachusetts Institute of Technology alumni
University of Vienna alumni
American hematologists
1932 births